The office of the Mayor of Fayetteville, North Carolina, currently held by Mitch Colvin since 2017, is the chief legislator of the city of Fayetteville, though as a first among equals, as Fayetteville is a Council-Manager city.

The Mayor of Fayetteville is elected for a two-year term. The city's mayoral and municipal election are held during off-years. The mayoral election is nonpartisan.

The Story of Fayetteville and the Upper Cape Fear
All twelve consecutive Mayors who have held office since 1961 have signed a copy of "The Story of Fayetteville and the Upper Cape Fear." The book, which was published in 1950, was written by John Oates.

Mayors of Fayetteville since 1961

See also
 Timeline of Fayetteville, North Carolina

References

Fayetteville